The 2010 Women's World Open Squash Championship was the women's edition of the World Open, which serves as the individual world championship for squash players. It was part of the WISPA Platinum series of the Women's International Squash Players' Association (WISPA) World Tour. The 2010 event took place in Soho Square, Sharm El Sheikh in Egypt from 15 to 22 September 2010.

Prize money and ranking points
For 2010, the prize purse was $147,000. The prize money and points breakdown is as follows:

Seeds

Draw and results

See also
World Open
2010 Men's World Open Squash Championship
2010 Women's World Team Squash Championships

References

External links
 

World Squash Championships
W
2010 in Egyptian sport
Squash tournaments in Egypt
Sharm El Sheikh
Wor
International sports competitions hosted by Egypt